These Are the Days may refer to:

Film and television
These Are the Days (TV series), a 1970s American animated series
These Are the Days, a 2000 concert video by Estradasphere

Music

Albums
These Are the Days (Lit album) or the title song, 2017
These Are the Days (Saybia album), 2004
These Are the Days, by Dave Hensman, 2006
These Are the Days, by Jann Arden, 2018
These Are the Days, by Love & the Outcome, 2016

Songs
"These Are the Days" (Ian McNabb song), 1991
"These Are the Days" (Van Morrison song), 1989
"These Are the Days", by the Exies from A Modern Way of Living with the Truth, 2007
"These Are the Days", by the Human League from Octopus, 1995
"These Are the Days", by Jamie Cullum from Twentysomething, 2003
"These Are the Days", by O-Town from O2, 2002
"These Are the Days", by Paul Westerberg from Eventually, 1996
"These Are the Days", by Wolfstone from Terra Firma, 2007

See also
"These Are Days", a 1992 song by 10,000 Maniacs